Balatina is a commune in Glodeni District, Moldova. It is composed of five villages: Balatina, Clococenii Vechi, Lipovăț, Tomeștii Noi and Tomeștii Vechi.

Notable people  
 Maia Laguta

Gallery

References

Communes of Glodeni District
Populated places on the Prut